Chicago-Kent College of Law is the law school of the Illinois Institute of Technology, a private research university in Chicago, Illinois. It is the second oldest law school in the state of Illinois. In 2023, Chicago-Kent was ranked 94th among U.S. law schools by U.S. News & World Report and its trial advocacy program is ranked as the 7th best program in the United States. 

Chicago-Kent was founded in 1888 by Justice Joseph M. Bailey. Today, it employs more than 140 faculty members and hosts more than 700 students in its Juris Doctor program, Master of Laws, and joint degree programs.The school is recognized for its three-year legal writing curriculum and offers J.D. concentrations in business law, criminal litigation, environmental and energy law, intellectual property, labor and employment, and privacy law.

The law school's chief publication is the Chicago-Kent Law Review, which publishes one volume of three issues each year. The law review has received contributions from U.S. Supreme Court Justice John Paul Stevens, Circuit Judge Richard A. Posner, and author Michael Crichton. Students at Chicago-Kent publish five other legal journals on an annual basis, including the Chicago-Kent Journal of Intellectual Property and the Seventh Circuit Review.

History
Chicago-Kent College of Law was founded in 1888 by Appellate Judge Thomas Moran and Judge Joseph Bailey. The classes started in the judges' chambers to prepare men and women for the newly instituted Illinois bar examination. A year later, in 1888, the Chicago College of Law was incorporated. In 1891, Emma Baumann graduated from Chicago College of Law, becoming the first woman to earn a law degree from the school. Ida Platt, in 1894, graduated with honors and also became the first black woman admitted to the Illinois bar.

During the same period, Marshall D. Ewell, former dean of Northwestern University Law School, returned to academia to found Kent College of Law, which was named after Chancellor James Kent, author of Commentaries on American Law, a classic in early American legal scholarship. Within 10 years, the Chicago College of Law and Kent College of Law merged to form Chicago-Kent College of Law.

The law school has a notable history of firsts, including the establishment of the first chapters of Lambda Epsilon, later Phi Alpha Delta, the world’s largest legal fraternity, and the creation of the Chicago-Kent Law Review, which began as the Athenaeum Law Bulletin in 1923, one of the nation's first law reviews.

Chicago-Kent moved several times during its history, including to the 116 North Michigan Avenue building in 1912 and the 10 North Franklin Street building in 1924, which served as its home for the next 50 years, prior to its final relocation at 565 West Adams Street in Chicago's West Loop neighborhood. In 1969, Chicago-Kent merged with the Illinois Institute of Technology to prepare students to face the challenges of a complex society.

After the merger, Chicago-Kent's reputation for developing creative approaches to legal education increased dramatically in scope and depth. The law school pioneered the three-year legal writing and research program in 1978 and established the first in-house, fee-generating law school clinic in 1976. The law school's trial advocacy program was established in 1971 and the Moot Court Honor Society in 1978. In 1984, it became the first law school to make the computer an integral part of the study of law. Many of the applications of technology now taken for granted in the law school classroom were pioneered at Chicago-Kent. 

In 1989, Chicago-Kent established a chapter of the Order of the Coif, an honorary scholastic society that encourages excellence in legal education by fostering a spirit of careful study and recognizing students, lawyers, judges, and teachers for their outstanding legal scholarship.

Rankings and Honors
The 2023 edition of U.S. News & World Report ranked Chicago-Kent College of Law:
94th in the country overall
4th in the Chicago Metropolitan Area
5th in Illinois
7th in Trial Advocacy
12th in Intellectual Property Law
13th in the country overall for its part-time law school program

The law school's trial advocacy teams have a long tradition of excellence at both national and regional competitions, and have won the National Trial Competition, the premier trial advocacy competition in the United States, in 1988, 2007, 2008, and 2015.

Some of Chicago-Kent's past competition wins and accolades include being finalists in Syracuse Law's National Trial League, national quarterfinalists and regional champions in the National Trial Competition, and quarterfinalists in the Queens District Attorney's National Trial Competition. The law school's students have also been regional finalists in the American Association for Justice Student Trial Competition and quarterfinalists in the University of South Carolina Law's Trials and Tribulations National Trial Competition. In addition, Chicago-Kent's students have won the Best Advocate award in several competitions, including the South Texas Mock Trial Challenge and the All-Star Bracket Challenge. 

In the 2020-2021 competition year, Chicago-Kent's trial advocacy teams were particularly successful, winning the Top Gun National Mock Trial Competition XII and being regional champions in the National Trial Competition. They also had semifinalists in the National Ethics Trial Competition and the Drexel Battle of the Experts, as well as quarterfinalists in the South Texas Mock Trial Challenge and the Stetson National Pre-Trial Competition.

Degree Programs
Chicago-Kent College of law, in conjunction with the Office of International Programs, and the Illinois Institute of Technology's Stuart School of Business, offer the following programs:
Juris Doctor (J.D.) Program
J.D. Certificates and Concentrations:
Business Law
Intellectual Property Law
Legal Innovation and Technology
Public Interest Law
Criminal Litigation
International and Comparative Law
Litigation and Alternative Dispute Resolution
Environmental and Energy Law
Labor and Employment Law
Privacy Law
Workplace Litigation and Alternative Dispute Resolution
Graduate LL.M. Programs
Global Business and Financial Law
Legal Innovation and Technology
International Intellectual Property Law
Trial Advocacy for International Students
U.S., International and Transnational Law
Joint Degree Programs
J.D./LL.M. in Global Business and Financial Law
J.D./M.B.A.
J.D./M.S. in Finance
J.D./M.S. in Sustainability Analytics and Management
J.D./M.P.P.A.
Dual LL.M & M.B.A. degree program

Institutes and Centers
Center for Access to Justice & Technology
Center for Information, Society, and Policy
Center for Open Government
Global Law and Policy Initiative
IIT Center for Diabetes Research and Policy
Institute on Biotechnology and the Human Future
Institute for Law and the Humanities
Institute for Law and the Workplace
Institute for Science, Law and Technology
Jury Center
The Center for Computer-Assisted Legal Instruction (CALI) and Oyez Project are headquartered at Chicago-Kent

Notable Alumni
 Kathy Salvi, 1984. Partner at Salvi & Maher, Republican nominee for the United States Senate
 Robert Sengstacke Abbott, 1898. Founder of the Chicago Defender 
 Pablo Almaguer, former Chair of the State Bar of Texas Board of Directors  
 Anita Alvarez, former Cook County State's Attorney
 Stanley C. Armstrong, 1911. Former Illinois state representative
 Carson Block, investor and founder of Muddy Waters Research
Esther Dunshee Bower, 1902. Co-founder, Illinois League of Women Voters
 Anne M. Burke, 1983. Illinois Supreme Court Justice
 J. Herbert Burke, 1940. U.S. Representative from Florida 1967-1979
 Frank J. Christensen (attended), American labor leader 
 Frank J. Corr, Acting mayor of Chicago, March 15, 1933 – April 8, 1933 
 William L. Dawson (attended), U.S. Congressman 
 Billy Dec, nightlife entrepreneur 
 Peter K. De Vuono, 1934, Illinois state representative and lawyer
 Samuel Ettelson, 1897. Illinois state senator and attorney
 Harris W. Fawell, U.S. Congressman 
 Thomas D. Flanagan, 1963. Lawyer, Founder of Flanagan | Bilton
 M. G. Gordon, Businessman, inventor, and social theorist 
 Robert J. Gorman, 1940. Attorney 
 Earnest A. Greene, state representative in 1936
 Oscar Raymond Holcomb, 1892. former Justice of the Washington Supreme Court
 Randy Hultgren, 1993. Republican U.S. Representative for Illinois' 14th Congressional District 
 Charles P. Kindregan, Jr., legal author, professor, expert on modern family law 
 Florence King, the first female patent attorney in America
 Weymouth Kirkland, Namesake partner of Kirkland & Ellis
 Carolyn H. Krause, Member of the Illinois House of Representatives 
 Abraham Lincoln Marovitz, 1925. Appointed to Federal Court for the Northern District of Illinois by President John F. Kennedy, 1963
 James T. Londrigan, Justice of the Illinois Appellate Court from the 4th district.
 Richard B. Ogilvie, 1949. Illinois Governor, 1969–1973
 Maria Pappas, Cook County Treasurer.
 Kwame Raoul, Illinois Attorney General
 Larry Rogers, Jr., commissioner on the Cook County Board of Review
 Peter Roskam, 1989. Republican U.S. Representative for Illinois' 6th Congressional District 
 Ilana Kara Diamond Rovner, 1966. First woman appointed to the U.S. Court of Appeals for the Seventh Circuit, by President Bush, 1992 
 Jim Ryan, 1971. Former Illinois attorney general 
 Bob Schillerstrom, DuPage County Board Chairman 
 Nathan B. Spingold, vice-president of Columbia Pictures
 James E. Strunck, 1950. Illinois state senator and judge
 Chad Taylor, District Attorney for Shawnee County, KS
 Charles H. Thompson, 1918, Chief Justice, Illinois Supreme Court, 1945, 1945, 1949, 1950
 Jerry Vainisi, football executive and businessman
 Arthur Wilhelmi, 1993. Member of the Illinois Senate 
 Bruce Wolf, sports journalist

Notable Faculty
 Michael T. Cahill, Dean of Brooklyn Law School
 Ralph Brill, legal writing scholar

Employment 
According to Chicago-Kent's official ABA-required disclosures, 89.9% of the Class of 2015 obtained employment nine months after graduation. Chicago-Kent's Law School Transparency under-employment score is 20.9%, indicating the percentage of the Class of 2013 unemployed, pursuing an additional degree, or working in a non-professional, short-term, or part-time job nine months after graduation.

Costs
The total cost of attendance (indicating the cost of tuition, fees, and living expenses) at Chicago-Kent for the 2013–2014 academic year is $64,867. The Law School Transparency estimated debt-financed cost of attendance for three years is $239,727.

Publications
 Chicago-Kent Law Review
 Chicago-Kent Journal of Environmental and Energy Law
 Employee Rights and Employment Policy Journal
 Illinois Public Employee Relations Report
 Chicago-Kent Journal of Intellectual Property
 Seventh Circuit Review
 The Journal of International and Comparative Law
 Satyam: The Chicago-Kent College of Law's Journal on South Asia and the Law

References

External links
 Official website

1888 establishments in Illinois
Educational institutions established in 1888
Illinois Institute of Technology
Law schools in Illinois